Neroni is an Italian-language surname. Notable people with the surname include:

Bartolomeo Neroni (c.1505–1571), Italian painter, sculptor, architect, and engineer
Diotisalvi Neroni (1401–1482), Italian politician

See also
Negroni (surname)
Negroni, a cocktail named after Pascal Olivier Count de Negroni

Italian-language surnames
Surnames of Italian origin